Stefan Kwoczała (15 June 1934 – 7 July 2019) was a Polish motorcycle speedway rider. He won the Polish championship in 1959 and reached the World Final in 1960, placing 7th.

Career 
Born in Kiedrzyn, Kwoczała rode for Włókniarz Częstochowa in the Polish league between 1955 and 1961, and in 1959 won the Polish championship at Rybnik. The same year he won one of the continental rounds of the World Championship, but failed to qualify for the final.

Kwoczała finished third in the 1960 European final at Wrocław, qualifying for the World final at Wembley Stadium, in which he scored 8 points to finish 7th.

Kwoczała also rode in the National League in the UK in 1960 for Leicester Hunters. 

His career ended after suffering a fractured skull in a crash at Kraków in 1961 during the Golden Helmet competition. After retiring from racing he moved into coaching riders at Włókniarz Częstochowa and Gwardia Łódź.

World Final Appearances

Individual World Championship
 1960 -  London, Wembley Stadium - 7th - 7pts

Death
Stefan Kwoczała died in Częstochowa during the night of 6/7 July 2019, aged 85.

References

1934 births
2019 deaths
Polish speedway riders
People from Częstochowa
Leicester Hunters riders